Legislative elections were held in Kazakhstan on 9 December 1995, with a second round on 23 December. The result was a victory for the People's Union of Kazakhstan Unity, which won 25 of the 67 seats. Voter turnout was 79.8%.

Background
In March 1994, the first post-independence general elections for the former unicameral Parliament took place. A year later, Kazakhstan's Constitutional Council invalidated this poll and declared the legislature illegal. President of the Republic Nursultan Nazarbayev thereupon announced the dissolution of the Parliament and plans to rule by decree pending new elections. A majority of the 177 Deputies challenged the dissolution.

On 30 August 1995, a new constitution providing, inter alia, for a smaller bicameral legislature was approved by popular referendum. On 2 October, the President announced the December election dates.

Elections
The overall conduct of the polling was overseen by the Central Election Commission (OSK). According to it, 285 candidates (128 self-nominated, 157 registered to parties or public associations) ran for the 67 Mazhilis seats. As for the Senate, 49 candidates vied for the 40 elective seats, with 14 of the 20 constituencies being uncontested. There were a series of limitations on pre-election campaigning.

The 9 December polling day for the Mazhilis was monitored by domestic and international observers and saw a reported turnout of over 79%. Observers from the Organization for Security and Co-operation in Europe questioned this figure, citing a number of irregularities, including multiple voting by the same individual. At the end of the day, only 41 candidates were declared elected with the required thresholds. Two weeks later, on 23 December, another 13 Deputies were chosen. Finally, on 4 February 1996, the remaining 13 seats were filled. Of the opposition parties, many boycotted the poll.

On 30 January, the newly constituted Parliament met in joint session for the first time. The Council of Ministers was headed by Prime Minister Akezhan Kazhegeldin.

Results

References

External links
Inter-Parliamentary Union Report on 1995 Kazakhstan Elections
Parliament of Republic of Kazakhstan
Central Election Commission

Kazakhstan
Legislative election
Elections in Kazakhstan
Election and referendum articles with incomplete results